Fort St. Louis or Fort Saint Louis may refer to:


Canada
 Fort Saint Louis (Newfoundland), Placentia, Newfoundland
 Fort Saint Louis, a fort in what is now Moose Factory, Ontario
 Fort St. Louis (Shelburne County, Nova Scotia)
 Fort St. Louis (Guysborough County, Nova Scotia)
 Fort St. Louis, former name of Fort Chambly, Chambly, Quebec
 Fort St. Louis, alternate name of Fort de la Corne in Saskatchewan.

United States
 Fort Saint Louis (Illinois), a French fort built by La Salle in 1683 and later known as Starved Rock
 Fort Saint Louis, a French colony from 1685 until 1688 near what is now Inez, Texas

Elsewhere
 Fort Saint Louis (Martinique), a 17th-century French fortress in Fort-de-France, Martinique
 Saint-Louis, Senegal, the French colonial capital in Senegal
 Castle of San Luis de Bocachica, a 17th century Spanish fortress that defended Cartagena, Colombia

See also 
 Saint Louis (disambiguation)